The R46 is a New York City Subway car model that was built by the Pullman Standard Company from 1975 to 1978 for the IND/BMT B Division. They replaced all remaining Arnine cars and General Electric-powered R16s, and some R10s. The R46 was the second order of 75-foot cars to be ordered for the New York City Subway, after the R44s.

The first R46s ran in passenger service on July 14, 1975. The fleet was initially slated to be delivered between 1973 and 1975, but a strike at Pullman's factory delayed final deliveries until 1978. Several hundred cracks were found in the R46 trucks during their first few years of service, leading them to be referred to as "the most troubled cars ever purchased". Morrison–Knudsen rebuilt the R46s in 1990–1992. They are expected to remain in service until the second quarter of 2023, when they will be expected to be replaced by the R211s, effectively retiring the aging R46s.

Description

The R46s are numbered 5482–6207 and 6208–6258 (even numbers only). 5482–6207 were originally numbered 500–1227 (except numbers 941 & 1054, as those two cars were scrapped prior to overhaul), and 6208–6258 were originally numbered 1228–1278 (even numbers only). The R46 order consisted of 754 single cars, originally planned to be 745, that were numbered from 500 to 1278. Even cars with cabs are A cars; odd cars without cabs are B cars. The cars cost about $285,000 each. Due to their length, they cannot run on the BMT Jamaica Line.

The R46s were constructed with sheet rubber floors, plastic seats, fluorescent lighting, spaces for ceiling advertisements, and the use of air springs instead of heavy metal springs. The change in springs reduced noisy and bumpy rides. The cars were not equipped with straphangers like previous models. Instead, horizontal bars that passengers could hold on to were installed. The cars were built with air-conditioning.

History

Delivery

On April 7, 1972, Pullman Standard bid on the contract for 900 subway cars, and it was the highest bidder. It put in a bid of $273,000 per car, or $246 million for the entire contract. Other bidders included General Electric, Rohr Industries, and Westinghouse Electric Corporation. The cars were to be constructed almost identically to the R44s. Once the order was awarded to Pullman Standard, the cars were constructed at the company's shops on the South Side of Chicago. The subway car order was the largest single order of passenger cars in United States railroad history at the point of the fleet's completion.

Once the order was reduced to 754 cars, the entire cost of the order was reduced to $210.5 million. The first cars were expected to be testing in the NYC Subway by October 1973, and all of the cars were expected to be delivered by October 15, 1975. Due to a strike at the Pullman Standard on October 1, 1977, along with other problems, the final R46s entered service in December 1978, three years behind schedule.

Manufacturing problems and incidents
In March 1977, there was a crack found in the frame of one of the lightweight trucks built by Rockwell International, which resulted in a motor breaking loose from the truck's transom arms, striking an axle. By 1978, cracks were found in 264 R46 trucks. Because of these problems, all R46s had to be checked three times per week for truck cracks. In February 1978, 889 cracks were found in 547 of the trucks. The cracking was such a bad problem that on June 14, 1979, New York City Mayor Koch ordered R46s with trucks that had two or more cracks out of service. Then, more than 1,200 cracks had been found by that day, and they were classified into seven types. There was an account that called the R46s "the most troubled cars ever purchased". By this time, the number of cracks had almost doubled, from 889 cracks found in February 1979 to 1,700 in March 1980. In order to keep track of the R46s' structural issues, they were inspected several times a week. In September 1980, two types of cracks that were not seen before were found on the trucks. As a result, the NYCTA tried to minimize usage of the R46 fleet, until their trucks were replaced with new R44 type standard trucks ordered from General Steel Industries and Buckeye Industries.

In July 1979, Pullman Standard informed the MTA that the hand brake assemblies for the R46 were problematic. In late July 1979, inspections revealed that the steel where the car body was joined to the truck was wearing away, a severe safety issue. At the end of 1979, many other flaws were discovered in the R46 fleet, and the Transit Authority filed another US$80 million charge against Pullman Standard and a number of other subcontractors. This lawsuit invalidated an agreement made with Pullman by executive director John G. DeRoos for US$1.5 million in spare parts to remedy the defects.

In 1983, organizations for the blind stated that the gaps in between R44 and R46 cars were dangerous, since the blind could mistake the spaces for doorways.

On April 26, 1986, cars 1054 and 941 were heavily damaged when an E train hit the tunnel wall near Jamaica–179th Street. The accident occurred because the 54-year old motorman, Alick Williams of Saint Albans, had a heart attack; he died at the scene. The two damaged cars were scrapped on June 4, 1987.

General Overhaul Program

From 1990 to 1992, Morrison–Knudsen of Hornell, New York, rebuilt the remaining 752 R46s through the NYCTA's General Overhaul Program (GOH). During the GOH, the fleet received the same LCD destination signs as the R44s, replacing the older rollsigns. The blue stripes on the side of the cars were removed, resulting in the appearance of an entirely unpainted car body (the fiberglass ends remain painted silver to match the stainless sides). Other improvements included the rebuilding of all mechanical systems and making the R46 more compatible with other car types. Also, their trouble-prone WABCO RT-5 or P-Wire braking system was removed, and replaced with a more reliable NYAB Newtran SMEE braking/control system.

After their overhaul, the R46s were renumbered 5482–6258 in the mid-1990s. Cars 5482–6205 were linked in sets of four, cars 6208–6258 (even only) were linked up as A-A pairs, and cars 6206–6207 were configured as one A-B married pair. Like the R44s, most of the R46s had their original two-note warning tones replaced with the same ones found on the R62, R62A, R68, and R68A; some cars retain their pre-GOH door chimes. Due to the overhaul, the fleet's reliability has vastly improved, and the R46 is no longer considered to be the lemon that it once was.

Post-overhaul
In 1981, the New York Transit Authority's car replacement program estimated that the R46s would be replaced in 2011. However, the MTA now estimates the cars to remain in service until the mid-2020s, when they will be replaced by the R211s. Since the late 2000s, the R46s have undergone intermittent rounds of scheduled maintenance as their parts age over time to extend their usefulness until their retirement.

On May 2, 2014, set 5742–5745 was involved in a derailment due to track defects while running on the F. The whole set was pulled from service, but was repaired and returned to service in February 2016.

On June 27, 2017, set 6150–6153 was involved in a derailment north of 125th Street while in service on the A. The whole set was taken out of service. Cars 6150–6151 suffered body damage as they collided with tunnel columns and were retired. Car 6151 was briefly retained and fitted with strip maps, colored wraps, and had some seats removed to serve as a non-operational mockup for future retrofits, all as a part of the 2017 action plan. Meanwhile, cars 6152–6153 were linked with cars 6206–6207 to create a new four-car set and re-entered service.

On September 20, 2020, set 6062–6065 was involved in a derailment at 14th Street when a man placed track tie plates onto the main rails, causing the train to derail. The whole set was taken out of service. Car 6062 suffered body damage as it collided with track-side columns and was retired. Meanwhile, cars 6063–6065 were linked with car 6212 to create a new four-car set and re-entered service. Car 6214, no longer paired with a mate, was subsequently taken out of service and remains in storage.

Set 5550–5553 was involved in a shooting in April 2022, and has been out of service ever since the incident.

References

Further reading
 Sansone, Gene. Evolution of New York City subways: An illustrated history of New York City's transit cars, 1867-1997. New York Transit Museum Press, New York, 1997

External links

nycsubway.org - NYC Subway Cars: R46

New York City Subway rolling stock
Pullman Company
Train-related introductions in 1975